Recordead Live – Sextourcism in Z7 is the third DVD by Finnish heavy metal band Lordi. The show was recorded on 23 November 2018 at Z7 Konzertfabrik in Pratteln, Switzerland, during the band's tour in support of their ninth studio album, Sexorcism. It was released on 26 July 2019. The set also included a two disc live album CD version of the concert.

Track listing
Sexorcism
Would You Love a Monsterman?
Missing Miss Charlene/House of Ghosts
Your Tongue's Got the Cat
Heaven Sent Hell on Earth
Mr. Killjoy
Mana Solo
Rock the Hell Outta You
Blood Red Sandman
It Snows in Hell
Hella Solo
She's a Demon
Slashion Model Girls
Naked in My Cellar
Rock Police
Ox Solo
Hug You Hardcore
SCG9: The Documented Phenomenon
Evilyn
The Riff
Amen Solo
Nailed by the Hammer of Frankenstein
Who's Your Daddy
Devil Is a Loser
Hard Rock Hallelujah

Bonus content
"A Day in the Life on Sextourcism"

Music Videos:
Inferno (previously unreleased)
Would You Love a Monsterman? (2002 version)
Devil Is a Loser
Blood Red Sandman
Hard Rock Hallelujah
It Snows in Hell
Who's Your Daddy?
Would You Love a Monsterman? (2006 version)
Bite It Like a Bulldog
This Is Heavy Metal
The Riff
Scare Force One
Hug You Hardcore
Naked in My Cellar

CD 1
Sexorcism
Would You Love a Monsterman?
Missing Miss Charlene/House of Ghosts
Your Tongue's Got the Cat
Heaven Sent Hell on Earth
Mr. Killjoy
Rock the Hell Outta You
Blood Red Sandman
It Snows in Hell
She's a Demon

CD 2
Slashion Model Girls
Naked in My Cellar
Rock Police
Hug You Hardcore
Evilyn
The Riff
Nailed by the Hammer of Frankenstein
Who's Your Daddy
Devil is a Loser
Hard Rock Hallelujah

Personnel 
 Mr Lordi – vocals
 Amen – guitars
 OX – bass
 Mana – drums, backing vocals
 Hella – keyboards

References

Lordi albums
2019 live albums
2019 video albums
Live video albums